Adda Gamber (Punjabi and Urdu: اڈا گیمر) is a town located between District Okara and District Sahiwal in the Punjab province of Pakistan. Adda Gamber is Attached to Okara Cantt and falls in the revenue limits of District Sahiwal. Post Code for Adda Gamber is 57460.

Location 
Adda Gamber is situated on the G.T Road, near Okara Cantonment. Adda Gamber has located Approximately 11 Km from Okara City and 25 Km from Sahiwal. Adda Gamber is located contiguous to Chak No 52/5-L.

Railway Station 

The Railway Station of Adda Gamber is called Okara Cantt Railway Station. Its old Name was Gamber Station.The station Code of Okara Cantt Railway Station is OKC.

Train Accident 
At Adda Gamber Railway station, On 29 September 1957 a Karachi bound Express passenger train was bumped with a stationary oil train. Almost 300 people were killed and 150 were injured in that accident.

Banks 
There are two banks in Ada Gamber. The Branches of Habib Bank Limited (HBL) and The Bank Of Punjab (BOP) is Located in Adda Gamber. Habib Bank Limited (HBL) Adda Gamber Branch is the Older Than Bank Of Punjab (BOP) Adda Gamber Branch.

HBL Adda Gamber Branch 
Habib Bank Limited (HBL) is Situated at G.T Road Near Vegetable Market, Adda Gamber, District Sahiwal. It is the oldest Bank in Adda Gamber. This HBL  Branch was established on 13, August 1969. The Branch Code for Habib Bank Limited (HBL) Adda Gamber Branch is 0678. This Branch has the facility of Automated Teller Machine (ATM).

BOP Adda Gamber Branch 
The Bank Of Punjab (BOP) is located at G.T Road Adda Gamber, District Sahiwal. This Branch of BOP also has a facility of Automated Teller Machine (ATM). The Branch Code of The Bank Of Punjab (BOP)Adda Gamber Branch is 0420.

Politics 
Politically Adda Gamber is in District Sahiwal. Adda Gamber is in NA-147 (Sahiwal-I) Which is the constituency of the National Assembly of Pakistan. Before the 2018 Pakistani general election, constituency NA-147 was NA-160(Sahiwal-I). Syed Imran Ahmed Shah is an Elected Member of the National Assembly (MNA) From this constituency, NA-147 of the National Assembly. Politically he belongs to the political party of Pakistan Muslim League (Nawaz) Known as PML-N. At the Provincial level, Adda Gamber is Located in PP-196(Sahiwal-I), a constituency of Provincial Assembly of the Punjab. In the 2013 Elections, this Constituency was PP-220 but later in the 2018 Pakistani General Election, it becomes PP-196. Peer Khizer Hayat Shah Khagga has been Elected as Member of Provincial Assembly (MPA) from PP-196. He was candidate of Pakistan Muslim League (Nawaz) Known as PML-N.

References 

21{ 5 Studio Gamber Neyar Police choky ada gamber No 044288262 }

Populated places in Sahiwal District
Cities and towns in Punjab, Pakistan